Kevin Lee (born 19 February 1981) is an English actor, who has played roles in Chinese films directed by Jackie Chan, Zhang Yimou, and Wu Jing. Lee typically plays western villains and has played leading roles in recent films directed by Wu.

Early life 
Lee was born in Huntingdon, Cambridgeshire. As a child, he loved watching Chinese martial arts films, including films starring Jackie Chan, Bruce Lee and Jet Li.

He gained a degree in IT, but decided to study Chinese martial arts in Mudanjiang, Heilongjiang province, China, before moving back to the UK. After working as a salesman and financial consultant in the UK, he trained as an actor before moving back to China in 2010.

Film career 
Lee says that he met director Wu Jing while renewing his work visa at the Public Security Bureau in the Chinese capital of Beijing. There, he starred in Wu Jing's Wolf Warrior (2015), the first in the Chinese patriotic Wolf Warrior franchise, and featured in the Stanley Tong film Kung Fu Yoga (2016), starring Jackie Chan, and the Zhang Chong film Super Me (2019). He is best known for playing the American colonel Allan Maclean in The Battle at Lake Changjin (2021). He was cast in the Zhang Yimou movie Sniper (2022).

The characters he plays in all his films are all Westerners and villains, and he has become a staple of Chinese patriotic films, which often feature anti-Western sentiment. As such, Lee has been criticised on Western social media for the roles he plays, with many saying his films amount to propaganda for the Chinese government.

Lee has disputed these claims, saying that he is not paid by the Chinese government for his roles. Nevertheless, he has said that as a foreigner, he does not get to play the lead role in Chinese cinema, but has said the same goes the West, telling the BBC: "If you look at Hollywood movies, how many Chinese or Asian actors do you see play the leading man? The Chinese or Russians will always play the bad guy." However, he has criticised Chinese film censorship, saying that such censorship prevents Chinese films from entering Western markets.

See also 

 Benedict Wong

References

External links 

 
 Kevin Lee at Film Affinity

1981 births
English actors
People from Cambridgeshire
Living people
Actors from Cambridgeshire
People from Huntingdon
English emigrants to China